Fifth Avenue is a lost 1926 American silent drama film directed by Robert G. Vignola and starring Marguerite De La Motte, Allan Forrest, and Louise Dresser.<ref>[https://catalog.afi.com/Film/8980-FIFTH-AVENUE?sid= The AFI Catalog of Feature Films 1893-1993: 'Fifth Avenue]</ref>

Plot
As described in a film magazine review, Barbara Pelham, a young woman who arrives in New York City from the South to obtain an advance on her father’s cotton crop, is lured into staying at a disorderly house. It is here that Peter Heffner, the broker from whom she sought a loan, makes unwelcome advances to her. She flees the house just prior to it being raided by the police. Later she meets Neil Heffner, the son of the broker. A friendship that ripens to love forms between the young people. The young man’s father tries to discredit the young woman by calling her a prostitute, but her name is cleared by an explanation by Mrs. Kemp, who was the keeper of the resort.

Cast

Preservation
With no prints of Fifth Avenue located in any film archives, it is a lost film.

References

Bibliography
 Munden, Kenneth White. The American Film Institute Catalog of Motion Pictures Produced in the United States, Part 1''. University of California Press, 1997.

External links

Stills at www.silentfilmstillarchive.com

1926 films
1926 drama films
Silent American drama films
Films directed by Robert G. Vignola
American silent feature films
1920s English-language films
Producers Distributing Corporation films
American black-and-white films
Lost American films
1926 lost films
Lost drama films
1920s American films